Mark Templeton may refer to:

 Mark Templeton (trombonist) (born 1975), trombonist with the London Philharmonic Orchestra
 Mark Templeton (electronic musician) (born 1976), Canadian experimental electronic artist
 Mark B. Templeton, former CEO of Citrix Systems, Inc.